Kakaramea is a town in South Taranaki, New Zealand. State Highway 3 passes through it. Patea is about 6 km to the south-east, and Hāwera is about 20 km to the north-west.

Marae

The local Pariroa Marae is a traditional meeting ground for the Ngāti Ruanui hapū of Ngāti Hine, Ngāti Kōtuku, Ngāti Ringi, Ngāti Tūpito and Tuatahi. It features the Taiporohēnui meeting house.

In October 2020, the Government committed $1,479,479 from the Provincial Growth Fund to renovate Meremere Marae, Ketemarae Pā, Pariroa Marae and Taiporohēnui Marae, creating 35 jobs.

Education

The school and district celebrated their 125th anniversary in 2001.

References

South Taranaki District
Populated places in Taranaki